The Hymn of Panathinaikos or Syllogos Megalos (Great Club) is the anthem of Panathinaikos A.O. It was written in 1958. The music is by Giorgos Mouzakis, a well-known musician and trumpeter of the era, and the lyrics are by George Oikonomidis. Leandros Papathanasiou and the Trio Belcanto and later Giannis Vogiatzis were the singers.

According to the composers, the song was written after a winning game of Panathinaikos, while they left together the Apostolos Nikolaidis Stadium. Oikonomidis improvised the first verse "Syllogos Megalos..." and Mouzakis sketched a staff on a cigarette pack on the spot. The whistling heard in the beginning and end of the hymn imitates the style of "Colonel Bogey March" from the 1957 film The Bridge on the River Kwai.

Great Club

Older hymns
The first Hymn of Panathinaikos was recorded in Berlin in 1931, of whom only the refrain has survived.

The second hymn was created in 1948 by Kostas Kofiniotis, who wrote the lyrics and Giannis Vellas, who composed the score. It was sung by Panos Kokkinos and titled "Προχωρείτε πρός την Νίκη"(Make your way to Victory)

References

Panathinaikos A.O.
Greek music
Football songs and chants
1958 songs